Kahite is an unincorporated community and census-designated place (CDP) in Monroe County, Tennessee, United States. It was first listed as a CDP prior to the 2020 census. its population was 834.

It is in the northern part of the county and is bordered on three sides by Tellico Reservoir: Corntassel Branch to the south, Fourmile Creek to the north, and the main stem of the Tellico River to the east. To the north, across Fourmile Creek, is the town of Vonore.

Demographics

References 

Populated places in Monroe County, Tennessee
Census-designated places in Monroe County, Tennessee
Census-designated places in Tennessee